was a Sengoku period yamashiro-style Japanese castle located in the Negoya neighborhood of the city of Numazu, Shizuoka prefecture. The ruins have been protected as a National Historic Site since 1975.

Overview
Kōkukuji Castle is located on a ridge in the Ashitaka Mountains southwest of the center of modern Numazu city center. It consists of several kuruwa terraces protected by stone walls and a deep dry moat. These enclosures extend in a line from north to south, covering an area roughly 60 meters east-to-west by 50 meters north-to-south at an elevation of 36 meters. The highest part of the fortification is the Honmaru, or main enclosure, which may have held the tenshu, and to the east of the main enclosure is a stone platform which once held a cannon. The moat between the main enclosure and the neighboring kuruwa is 18 meters in depth.

History
Kōkukuji Castle was originally built by the Imagawa clan to protect the eastern border of Suruga Province in the 15th century, but the exact date is unknown. The site of the castle was formerly occupied by the Buddhist temple of Kōkuku-ji, and the castle retained this name. Around 1487, it came under the control of Hōjō Sōun, founder of the late Hōjō clan. Hōjō Sōun's sister, Kitagawa-dono was married to Imagawa Yoshitada, and Hōjō Sōun became a retainer of the Imagawa clan. Yoshitada fell in battle in 1476 and as  his son Imagawa Ujichika was still a minor, Ojika Norimitsu was appointed regent. However, Norimitsu later refused to turn over power as agreed, so Hōjō Sōun and his henchmen had him killed in order for the succession to go to his nephew Imagawa Ujichika. In return, Ujichika appointed Hōjō Sōun castellan of Kōkuku Castle.  

In 1491, Hōjō Sōun intervened in the conflict between the Ashikaga shogunate and the Ashikaga of the Horigoe Gosho and seized control of Izu Province. He then relocated to Niirayama Castle in central Izu, returning Kōkuku Castle back to the Imagawa.  The castle later changed hands between the Takeda clan and the Tokugawa clan after the fall of the Imagawa. After the Battle of Sekigahara, Tokugawa Ieyasu assigned the castle to Amano Yasukage, one of his old retainers. Amano was later disposed after an uprising in his territory and the castle was abolished in 1607.

Kōkokuji Castle is now only ruins with some stone wall, earthen walls and dry moat. The castle was listed as one of the Continued Top 100 Japanese Castles in 2017. It is located a 30-minute walk from Hara Station on the JR East Tōkaidō Main Line.

Gallery

See also
List of Historic Sites of Japan (Shizuoka)

References

External links 

Numazu city homepage

Castles in Shizuoka Prefecture
Ruined castles in Japan
History of Shizuoka Prefecture
15th-century establishments in Japan
Numazu, Shizuoka
Historic Sites of Japan
Suruga Province
Go-Hōjō clan
Imagawa clan